The Ross-Sewell House is a house in Jackson, in the U.S. state of Tennessee.

Location
The house is located at 909 Highland Avenue in Jackson, a city in Madison County, Tennessee, USA.

History
The land was acquired by George E. Rauscher, a businessman from Erin, Tennessee, in 1904. Shortly after, he built this house. It was designed in the Queen Anne architectural style.

In 1920, the house was acquired by Judge John William Ross. After his death in 1925, the house was held in a trust owned by the Jackson Building and Savings Association. In 1934, it was purchased by Samuel Sewell. After his death in 1936, it was inherited by his widow, Floy.

Architectural significance
It has been listed on the National Register of Historic Places since January 27, 1983.

References

Jackson, Tennessee
Houses on the National Register of Historic Places in Tennessee
Queen Anne architecture in Tennessee
National Register of Historic Places in Madison County, Tennessee